North Carolina's 11th congressional district encompasses most of Western North Carolina. Since January 3, 2023, the district has been represented by Chuck Edwards.

Redistricting 
The 11th district has historically been known for its volatile politics and was once considered one of the most competitive congressional districts in North Carolina. It was traditionally anchored by the heavily Democratic city of Asheville, with the rest of the district being split between Democratic-leaning counties in the south and Republican-leaning counties in the north.  Consequently, congressional races were historically hard-fought and often very close.

In 2011, the Republican-controlled legislature redrew the district, shifting much of Asheville to the 10th district, where the city's Democratic tilt was diluted by the overwhelming Republican inclination of the rest of the district. The new map split Asheville in such a way that in some neighborhoods, one side of the street moved to the 10th while the other side of the street stayed in the 11th.

To make up for the loss in population, the 11th absorbed some strongly Republican territory in the Foothills which had previously been in the 10th. On paper, it was one of the most Republican districts in the state. Due to the district becoming much more conservative, three-term Democratic incumbent Heath Shuler did not run for reelection in 2012, and was succeeded by Republican Mark Meadows.

In 2019, a panel of North Carolina judges ruled that the existing map was a partisan gerrymander, and ordered new congressional districts to be drawn ahead of the 2020 election. After review in December, a new map was approved. The district included the western part of Rutherford County and the entirety of Avery, Buncombe, Cherokee, Clay, Graham, Haywood, Henderson, Jackson, Macon, Madison, McDowell, Mitchell, Polk, Swain, Transylvania, and Yancey Counties. It still leans Republican, but much less so than the previous iteration, as it once again includes all of Asheville.

On February 23, 2022, the North Carolina Supreme Court approved a new map which removed Avery and Mitchell Counties from the district.

Counties 
Counties in the 2023-2025 district map.
 Buncombe County
 Cherokee County
 Clay County
 Graham County
 Haywood County
 Henderson County
 Jackson County
 Macon County
 Madison County
 McDowell County
 Polk County
 Rutherford County (part)
 Swain County
 Transylvania County
 Yancey County

List of members representing the district

Recent election results

2006

2008

2010

2012

2014

2016

2018

2020

2022

See also 

 North Carolina's congressional districts
 List of United States congressional districts

Notes

References

Further reading

External links
 Heath Shuler's House of Representatives website
 Political Graveyard List of Representatives (source for table)

1803 establishments in North Carolina
11
Western North Carolina